Glenhaven may refer to:
Glenhaven, New South Wales, Australia
Glenaven, Queensland, Australia formerly known as Glenhaven
Glenhaven, California, United States